Park Shopping Brasília is a shopping center located in the Sector of Southwest Isolated Areas (SAISO), in the administrative region of Guará, in the Federal District.

It was inaugurated on November 8, 1983, being the 2nd shopping center to be inaugurated in the Federal District and located on the road between Guará and the Brasília, near the Interstate Bus Station of Brasília.

It has 242 stores, including nine anchors (C & A, Fnac, Lojas Americanas, Riachuelo, Renner, Zara, Hot Zone, complex bowling Park Bowling and cinema complex ParkPlex group Severiano Ribeiro group and Paris Filmes), and five mega-stores (Ponto Frio, Livraria Siciliano, Centaur, Outback and Siberian). It has 264 shops, 03 floors, 12 escalators, 03 elevators, 2761 parking spaces and 11 cinemas. The consumer traffic is 13.9 million people a year.

The Park Shopping Brasília, has its sales per square among the highest in the country, and this expansion will further enhance your shopping concept reference and leading fashion center in the Federal District.

Expansion
 October/2008 - Fashion area with 22 stores
 November/2008 - New food court with 8 new restaurants
 June/2009 - 82 stores of various segments
 October/2009 - New parking lot

References

External links
Official Website
Multiplan group official website

Shopping centers in Brazil
Shopping malls established in 1983
Buildings and structures in Federal District (Brazil)
Tourist attractions in Federal District (Brazil)
Companies based in the Federal District (Brazil)